The Finland Volleyball League is highest level of men's volleyball in Finland. There are 10 teams in the league.

History 

The Finland Volleyball League has founded 1994. Before then, teams play league in the Champion League. In 2010, the league changed its name to Mestaruusliiga.

Schedule 

Each team plays each other team in the league four times —two game at home and one away. At the conclusion of the regular season, the teams ranked from 1–8 play in a playoff to determine the league champion.

Teams

Champions and medalists

References
 

Volleyball in Finland
Finland
Sports leagues established in 1994
1994 establishments in Finland
Professional sports leagues in Finland